Leslie Gagne (27 December 1906 – 1 June 1962) was a Canadian ski jumper. He competed in the individual event at the 1932 Winter Olympics.

References

External links
 

1906 births
1962 deaths
Canadian male ski jumpers
Olympic ski jumpers of Canada
Ski jumpers at the 1932 Winter Olympics
Skiers from Montreal